Monkey Mountain (also Wandike) is an indigenous village in the Potaro-Siparuni Region of Guyana. The village is inhabited by the Patamona and Macushi tribes. Monkey Mountain is located near the Brazilian border. The name is derived from the seasonal migration of monkeys.

Overview
The village has a school, a health centre, and a police station. The people in Monkey Mountain are multilingual, speaking Patamona, Macushi, Portuguese and English. The village received internet connection in 2019. The toshao (village chief) as of 2019 is Lincoln Singh.

A major attraction is the North Pakaraima Exposition, a two day event with exhibits and sport competitions for the indigenous communities.

Economy
The economy used to be based on subsistence farming, hunting and gathering. An important economic activity for the village is quarrying precious stones like crystals, amethyst, jasper and agate. 

In 2018, a lapidary was built with government assistance and in cooperation with the villages of Kato, Kurukabaru, Maikwak, and Tuseneng. The lapidary will allow the villagers to process the stones themselves, and export jewellery.

Transport
There is an unpaved road connection between Karasabai and Monkey Mountain. The main access is by air via the Monkey Mountain Airport located near the village.

References

Indigenous villages in Guyana
Mines in Guyana
Populated places in Potaro-Siparuni